Skåne County, sometimes referred to as Scania County in English, is the most southern county, or , of Sweden, basically corresponding to the traditional province Scania. It borders the counties of Halland, Kronoberg and Blekinge and connects to Capital Region, Denmark by the Öresund Bridge. The seat of residence for the Skåne Governor is the city of Malmö. The headquarters of Skåne Regional Council are located in both Kristianstad and Malmö.

The present county was created in 1997 when Kristianstad County and Malmöhus County were merged; it covers around 3% of Sweden's total area, while its population of 1.3 million comprises 13% of Sweden's total population. Prince Oscar is Duke of Skåne.

Endonym and exonym
When the new county was established in 1997, it was named Skåne län as its borders coincide with those of the province Skåne. In English, the county as well as the province are sometimes known as Scania, but the name Skåne is more frequently used, e.g. by the county administrative board.

Heraldry 
The coat of arms for Skåne County is the same as for the province of Skåne, only with the tinctures reversed and the crown, beak and tongue of the griffin in the same color. When the arms are shown with a royal crown, it represents the County Administrative Board, which is the regional presence of (royal) government authority. Blazon: "Gules, a Griffin's head erased Or, crowned and armed the same."

Provinces 
Skåne County is the administrative equivalent of the province of Skåne, but it also includes an insignificant part of the province of Halland.

Administration 
Skåne County is administered by Region Skåne, one of the 20 county councils of Sweden. Its main responsibilities are for the public healthcare system and public transport. In addition, it has for a trial period assumed certain tasks from the County Administrative Board. The two former administrative county councils of the province of Skåne shown on the map, Kristianstad County and Malmöhus County, which were established in 1719, were merged in 1997, forming the present county with boundaries that are almost identical to the boundaries of the province.

The seat of residence for the Governor (landshövding) is the city of Malmö. The County Administrative Board is a Government Agency headed by a Governor. See List of Skåne Governors.

County council 
Region Skåne is an evolved County Council, which was established in 1999 when the County Councils of the former counties were amalgamated.

Its county or regional assembly is the region's highest political body, and its members are elected by the electorate, as opposed to the county administrative board, that guards the national interests in the county under the chairmanship of the county governor (landshövding in Swedish).

Municipalities 

Skåne County contains 33 municipalities, the largest by population being Malmö Municipality (340,000 inhabitants), Helsingborg Municipality (145,000), Lund Municipality (123,000 inhabitants) and Kristianstad Municipality (85,000 inhabitants). The municipalities have municipal governments, similar to city commissions, and are further divided into parishes. The parish division is traditionally used by the Church of Sweden, but also serves as a divisioning measure for Swedish census and elections.

Elections

Riksdag
The table details all Riksdag elections held in the area currently constituting Skåne County since the unicameral era began in 1970. Although both were rounded to 49.3 under one decimal, the leftist bloc had 49.33 to 49.25% for the centre-right bloc in the 1970 election.

Regional

The county is divided into four parliamentary constituencies or electoral districts, electing 47 of the 349 members of the Riksdag. Each district is made up of one or more municipalities.

In the 2018 general election, the Sweden Democrats performed particularly well in Skåne County, having the highest number of voters in 21 out of the county's 33 municipalities.

Overall representation in the Riksdag during the 2018–2022 mandate period was as follows:

Localities in order of size
The ten most populous localities of Skåne County in 2020 were:

The ten largest municipalities of the county by total area are:

Demographics

Foreign background 
SCB have collected statistics on backgrounds of residents since 2002. These tables consist of all who have two foreign-born parents or are born abroad themselves. The chart lists election years and the last year on record alone.

Transport 

The motorway built between Malmö and Lund in 1953 was the first motorway in Sweden. With the opening of the Öresund Bridge between Malmö and Copenhagen (the longest combined road and rail bridge in Europe) in 2000, the Swedish motorways were linked with European route E20 in Denmark, and the two countries' railway systems were physically connected. Before the bridge was built there were train ferries operated between Helsingborg and Helsingør. There are also train ferries to and from Germany and Poland.

Skåne has three major public airports, Malmö Airport, Ängelholm–Helsingborg Airport and Kristianstad Airport. One of the oldest airports in the world still in use is located in Skåne, namely Ljungbyhed Airport, in operation since 1910. Starting in 1926, the Swedish Air Force used the airport for flight training, and up until the military school was moved to the nearby Ängelholm F10 Wing in 1997, the airport was extremely busy. In the late 1980s, it was Sweden's busiest airport, with a record high of more than 1,400 take-offs and landings per day.

The major ports of Skåne are Trelleborg, Ystad, Åhus, Copenhagen Malmö Port, Landskrona Harbour and Helsingborg Harbour. Ferry connections across the Baltic Sea operate from several smaller ports as well.

References

External links 

Skåne County official website
Skåne County Administrative Board

 
Counties of Sweden
Scania
1997 establishments in Sweden
States and territories established in 1997